The Hutcheson Stakes is an American Thoroughbred horse race held annually at Gulfstream Park in Hallandale Beach, Florida. An event raced on dirt, it is open to three-year-old horses.

Historical notes
Inaugurated on March 31, 1954, the Hutcheson Stakes was named in honor of labor leader William Levi Hutcheson (1874–1953) who served as a member of the Gulfstream Park Advisory Board. It has been one of several prep races for the Grade 1 Florida Derby.

Spectacular Bid captured the Hutcheson on his way to winning the 1979 Kentucky Derby as did Swale in 1984. Another notable winner of this race was Holy Bull who won the event in his first start of 1994 then went on to earn 1994 American Horse of the Year honors. Like Spectacular Bid, Holy Bull was voted into the National Museum of Racing and Hall of Fame.

On February 11, 2012, Starlight Racing's Thunder Moccasin won the Grade 2 Hutcheson Stakes. For trainer Todd Pletcher, it marked his seventh win of this event and for jockey John Velazquez it was his sixth. Both are records that still stand through 2020.

Records
Speed  record: 
 1:09.57 @ current distance of 6 furlongs: Awesome Banner (2016)
 1:20.80 @ 7 furlongs: Shecky Greene (1973) & Sensitive Prince (1978)

Most wins by an owner:
 2 - Michael Tabor (2001, 2003)
 2 - Meadow Stable (1958, 1965)

Most wins by a jockey:
 6 - John Velazquez (2000, 2003, 2004, 2005, 2006,  2012)

Most wins by a trainer:
 7 - Todd A. Pletcher   (2000, 2003, 2004, 2005, 2006, 2007, 2012)

Winners

See also 
Hutcheson Stakes top three finishers and starters

References

External links
 The Hutcheson Stakes at Pedigree Query

1954 establishments in Florida
Horse races in Florida
Gulfstream Park
Flat horse races for three-year-olds
Recurring sporting events established in 1954